The Wing of Night is a 2005 novel by Australian author Brenda Walker.

Notes

"Dedication: For Tom" 
Epigraph: "My own taste has always been for unwritten history and my present business is with the reverse of the picture." Henry James.

Awards

Waverley Library Award for Literature, The Alex Buzo Shortlist Prize, 2006: winner
Miles Franklin Literary Award, 2006: shortlisted 
New South Wales Premier's Literary Awards, Christina Stead Prize for Fiction, 2006: shortlisted 
Nita Kibble Literary Award, 2006: winner 
Asher Literary Award, 2007: winner

Reviews

"Australian Book Review" 
"Writer's Radio"

Interview

Jane Sullivan - "The Age"

References

2005 Australian novels
Viking Press books